Strengeriana is a genus of crabs in the family Pseudothelphusidae, containing the following species:
 Strengeriana antioquensis von Prahl, 1987
 Strengeriana bolivarensis Rodríguez & Campos, 1989
 Strengeriana cajaensis Campos & Rodríguez, 1993
 Strengeriana casallasi Campos, 1999
 Strengeriana chaparralensis Campos & Rodríguez, 1984
 Strengeriana flagellata Campos & Rodríguez, 1993
 Strengeriana florenciae Campos, 1995
 Strengeriana foresti Rodríguez, 1980
 Strengeriana fuhrmanni (Zimmer, 1912)
 Strengeriana huilensis Rodríguez & Campos, 1989
 Strengeriana maniformis Campos & Rodríguez, 1993
 Strengeriana quindiensis Campos & Camacho, 2019
 Strengeriana restrepoi Rodríguez, 1980
 Strengeriana risaraldensis Rodríguez & Campos, 1989
 Strengeriana taironae Rodríguez & Campos, 1989
 Strengeriana tolimensis Rodríguez & Diaz, 1980
 Strengeriana villaensis Campos & Pedraza, 2006

References

Pseudothelphusidae